Gliese 105 (also known as 268 G. Ceti) is a triple star system in the constellation of Cetus. It is located relatively near the Sun at a distance of 23.6 light-years (7.2 parsecs). Despite this, even the brightest component is barely visible with the unaided eye (see Bortle scale). No planets have yet been detected around any of the stars in this system.

This is a triple system with three stars that are all less massive than the Sun. The brightest component is designated HD 16160, and is known as Gliese 105 A. It is a K-type main-sequence star, about 70% the mass of the Sun. This star is unusual because its eruptions appear to not conform to the Waldmeier effect—i.e., the strongest eruptions of HD 16160 are not the ones characterized by the fast eruption onset.

A nearby star has a similar proper motion to Gliese 105 A, so it is assumed to be physically associated with the primary, and is known as Gliese 105 B. The two have an estimated separation of 1,200 astronomical units (au). It is a BY Draconis variable star whose brightness varies between 11.64 and 11.68 magnitudes; for that reason it has been given the designation BX Ceti.

A third companion, known as Gliese 105 C, lies much closer to A, currently at a distance of approximately 24 au. The pair A-C have an estimated orbital period of about 70 years. While detected directly, Gliese 105 C has also been observed to perturb Gliese 105 A from its usual position; from that, its orbit is estimated to have a high eccentricity of around 0.64 and a semimajor axis of 17 au. Gliese 105 C is an extremely faint red dwarf. It is roughly 8 to 9 percent the mass of the Sun, and it is about 20,000 times fainter than its parent star in visible light—at a distance of 1 au (the distance from the Earth to the Sun) it would only be four times brighter than the full moon.

References

External links
 Gliese 105 / HR 753 ABC SolStation entry.
  Gliese 105

Cetus (constellation)
K-type main-sequence stars
M-type main-sequence stars
HR, 0753
016160
012114
0753
Ceti, BX
0105
Ceti, 268
Triple star systems
BD+06 398
TIC objects